S-94 is a 2009 science fiction/horror short film by Japanese filmmaker Shozin Fukui. The film is set in a post-apocalyptic future where a deadly virus has brought humankind to the brink of extinction. Largely set within a subterranean bunker and filmed in monochrome, the film is visually reminiscent of Fukui's previous feature Rubber's Lover.

References

External links
 
S-94 Review at Midnight Eye

2009 films
2000s Japanese-language films
Japanese black-and-white films
Films directed by Shozin Fukui
2000s Japanese films
Films set in bunkers